Mount Baker is a volcano located in Washington, United States.

Mount Baker may also refer to:

Places
 Mount Baker (Ruwenzoris), in the Ruwenzori Range on the border of Uganda and the Congo
 Mount Baker (Waputik Mountains), in the Canadian Rockies
Mount Baker (Antarctica), in Antarctica
Mt. Baker Ski Area, located on the mountain in Washington
Mount Baker, Seattle, a neighborhood in Seattle
Mount Baker (Link station), a rail station that serves the neighborhood
 Mount Baker Secondary School, Cranbrook, British Columbia, Canada
 Mount Marcus Baker, in Alaska

Other uses
 USS Mount Baker, either of two ships named after this mountain:
 USS Mount Baker (AE-4), an ammunition ship of the U.S. Navy
 USNS Mount Baker (T-AE-34), an ammunition ship commissioned in 1972

See also
 
 Baker (disambiguation)
 Baker Mountain (disambiguation)
 Baker Peak (disambiguation)